NGC 4236 (also known as Caldwell 3) is a barred spiral galaxy located in the constellation Draco.

The galaxy is a member of the M81 Group, a group of galaxies located at a distance of approximately 11.7 Mly (3.6 Mpc) from Earth.  The group also contains the spiral galaxy Messier 81 and the starburst galaxy Messier 82. NGC 4236 is located away from the central part of the M81 group at a distance of 14.5 Mly (4.45 Mpc) from Earth.

See also
 NGC 55 - a similar galaxy

References

External links
 
 

M81 Group
Draco (constellation)
4236
07306
39346
003b